The Unreleased "D.C. Tapes" is the latest release by North Carolina music group, Nantucket. It's a compilation album which features eight never before released songs taken from demo tapes recorded in the 1980s, including a second version of their 1979 single "California".  The album was issued through the band's own label, Zella Records.

Track listing
What Comes Around Goes Around - 3:42
Blind Driver - 3:39
California [New Version] - 4:27
Just Lookin' at You - 3:41
You and I - 3:45
Nights on Fire - 4:12
Continental Lady - 4:35
All Night Long - 5:25

References
 Nantucket - A Band Of Desperate Men. Nantucket: Credits. Retrieved Apr. 23, 2007.

External links
 [ Nantucket on All Music Guide]
 Unofficial Nantucket Fansite
 Nantucket on MySpace

Nantucket (band) albums
2006 compilation albums